The Delhi Police (DP) is the law enforcement agency for the National Capital Territory of Delhi (NCT). Delhi Police comes under the jurisdiction of the Ministry of Home Affairs (MHA), Government of India. In 2015, sanctioned strength of Delhi Police was 84,536 (including I.R. Battalions) making it one of the largest metropolitan police forces in the world. About 25% of Delhi Police strength is earmarked for VIP security.

The headquarters of Delhi Police are located at Jai Singh Marg, Connaught Place, New Delhi. As of January 2019, there are 15 Districts of Delhi Police, each headed by a Deputy Commissioner of Police (DCP).

History
Delhi Police has its origin in a small security force, established in 1854, under the assistant of British Resident to the Mughal Imperial Courts. Founded in 1861 after the adoption of the Indian Police Act, Delhi Police remained a part of the Punjab Police until India gained independence in 1947.

Organisation

Before 1948 Delhi was part of Punjab Police.

1948–1966
In 1948, the Delhi Police was restructured. Mr D.W. Mehra became the first chief of Delhi Police. The strength of the Delhi Police in 1951 was about 8,000 with one Inspector General of Police (IGP) and eight Superintendents of Police (SP). In 1956 a post of Deputy Inspector General of Police was created. In 1961, the strength of Delhi police was over 12,000.

In 1966, the Delhi Police on the basis of the Khosla Commission Report was reorganized. Four police districts, namely, North, Central, South and New Delhi were created. In 1978, the Delhi Police Act was passed and the Commissioner System was introduced with effect from 1 July 1978.

J.N. Chaturvedi, with rank of IGP, became first Commissioner of Delhi Police from October 1978 – Jan 1980.

Impact of Sixth Central Pay Commission
Following the Sixth Central Pay Commission, the UPA Government, in 2008, decided to make promotions for Indian Police Service officers, even for higher ranks, time-bound. Indian Police Service officers are now promoted on a fixed time table, more or less independent of functional requirements or span of responsibility, up to the level of Inspector General of Police, at intervals of 4, 9, 13, 14, and 18 years of service.  The time-bound promotion, much of it non-functional, to high ranks apart from increasing the burden on the policing budget has made Delhi Police top-heavy, sluggish, and unwieldy. Delhi Police, which had one Inspector General (IG) until January 1980s, now has 12 officers with ranks senior to IGPs. They are called Commissioners and Special Commissioners, who are in the HAG grades and apex pay grades. In addition, Delhi police, instead of one IGP, has several dozen IGPs, as everyone gets to be IGP after completion of 18 years service.   New IG's  functions and responsibilities are no different from that of pre-1980s DIGs and Superintendents of Police (SPs).

Current Organisation

As of January 2019, Delhi Police has 15 Police Districts with 178 'territorial' Police Stations. Apart from this there are 7 Railway Police stations, 16 Metro Rail Police stations and 5 specialized crime units declared as Police Stations namely, Economic Offenses Wing, Crime Branch, Special Cell, Special Police Unit for Women and Children (SPUWAC) and Vigilance.

Training
Since 1984, DP Training College is located in the village of Jharoda Kalan and Wazirabad, Delhi .

Headquarters

The new Headquarters of Delhi Police is located at Jai Singh Marg, Connaught Place, New Delhi. Delhi Police is divided into twelve branches under the Commissioner of Delhi Police or CP. The main four among the branches, each under a Special Commissioner of Police (Special CP), are:

Special CP (Administration): The Special CP Administration has three Joint Commissioner of Police under him and two Additional CP's. One of them is responsible for Headquarters. Every Joint CP and Additional CP has a DCP under him. The CP responsible for Headquarters is in charge of Public Relations and has a Public Relations Officer (PRO) under him.

Special CP (Training): The Special CP has a Deputy Commissioner of Police (DCP) answering to him. The Vice-Principal of Police Training College (P.T.C) answers to the DCP.

Special CP (Security): The Special CP Security has three Joint CP's working under him. Each of them has an Additional CP under him. The Additional CP gives orders to the CP's of each Police Battalion

Special CP (Intelligence): The Special CP Intelligence has a Joint CP and an Additional CP working under him. The Additional CP gives orders to an Additional CP and to the F.R.R.O section. He is responsible for the registration of foreigners in the Delhi Police region. The Additional CP has a DCP working under him. There is an Additional DCP under the DCP.

In addition to the above officers, there are Special CP (Law & Order), Special CP (Crime), Special CP (Traffic) and Special CP (Special Cell).

Ranks and Hierarchy 

In 2015, Delhi Police under its Commissioner B.S. Bassi had 8 Special CP's, 20 Joint CP's and 15 Additional CP's followed by other sub-ordinates. The hierarchy in DP is as follows.

Officers
 Commissioner of Police (CP)
 Special Commissioner of Police (Special CP)
 Joint Commissioner of Police (Joint CP)
 Additional Commissioner of Police (Additional CP)
 Deputy Commissioner of Police (DCP) {Selection Grade}
 Deputy Commissioner of Police (DCP) {Junior Administrative Grade}
 Additional Deputy Commissioner of Police (Additional DCP)
 Assistant Commissioner of Police (ACP)

Sub-ordinates
 Inspector of Police
 Sub-Inspector of Police (SI)
 Assistant Sub-Inspector of Police (ASI)
 Head Constable
 Constable
 Home Guard

Note: A Police district is headed by a DCP rank officer, while a Police station is headed by an SHO who is usually an Inspector of Police.

Roles and Responsibilities

Delhi is the capital of India and is the centre of wide range of political, cultural, social and economic activities. The Delhi police has to play a number of roles so far maintenance of law and order is concerned. The Delhi Police undertakes the following activities:
 Investigating crimes
 Controlling criminal activities
 Protection of citizens
 Control traffic problem
The Delhi Police is considered to have the most advanced administrative system in India. It believes in the principle of 'Citizen First'. Traffic control is very important in order to avoid accidents and the Delhi police has taken several measures to control the traffic.

VIP security by Delhi Police
Out of a total Delhi police strength of 77,965, in 2016, over 20,000 personnel or over 25 percent, were assigned to secure VVIPs in Delhi.  Delhi Police Commissioner Alok Kumar Verma, arguing that 20,000 police force earmarked for VIP security was inadequate pitched for increasing earmarked Delhi Police for VVIP security from 20,000 to 22, 500.

Alok Kumar Verma said he will give the  "utmost priority" to get government to sanction the increase in police deployment for VVIP duties.  He is expected to play the Terror threat card to get the extra 2250 police personnel, citing Ministry of Home Affairs (MHA ), Intelligence Bureau, and Delhi police's special bureau threat assessments. The increase in Police strength for VVIP security will increase the deployment of police personnel per VIP from 17 to 19, and Police Deployment for VIP security from 25 percent to almost one third [28.8 percent] of its total strength.

The demand for increasing Police strength for Securing Delhi's VIP, at considerable cost, is against the background of worsening law and order situation in the rest of the city, especially the more deprived areas of the city of some 19 million people.

VVIP security

In addition Delhi Police deploys 79 Police Control Room Vehicles (Static and semi-static) in Lutyens' Delhi, where most of Delhi's VVIP live.   24 are exclusively for Members of Parliament (MPs). In addition Delhi Police provides static pickets, motor cycle patrol, and foot patrol, on 24-hour basis, including 39 static pickets, 17 motorcycle police patrols, and five Emergency Response Vehicles mounted patrols.  The high police presence is supplemented with surveillance devices: 230 Close Circuit Television Cameras are located in North Avenue, South Avenue, MS MP flats, Narmada Apartment, Brahmaputra Apartment and Swarn Jayanti Complex. This is in addition to 412 CCTVs are installed at various roads leading to ministers and MP's residences in Lutyens' Delhi.

Intelligence Bureau
The Intelligence Bureau and the Ministry of Home Affairs (India) (MHA) are responsible for identifying and nominating persons deserving police protection.  The level of police protection is decided by the Home Minister and the home Secretary.  There are four categories of protection or security cover: Z+, Z, Y, and X.  Who will get which category of security cover is decided by Security Categorization Committee (SCC) — headed by the home secretary.

Armed Police protection to those designated as deserving protection by MHA is provided by personnel drawn from central paramilitary forces under the home ministry such as the National Security Guard (NSG), CRPF, BSF, ITBP and Central Industrial Security Force (CISF).  In 2006 the CISF was mandated to raise a Special Security Group (SSG) for VIP security. The SSG unit in CISF came into being on 17 November 2006. This unit is responsible for the physical protection of highly threatened dignitaries/individuals, evacuation of Protected Persons, and providing static as well as mobile security to the Protected Persons". 

In addition to the MHA and the Intelligence Bureau, the Delhi Police Commissioner is also authorized to extend police protection on the basis of reports by the Special Bureau of Delhi police.

In 2012, during the tenure of the Congress(I) led government, the Intelligence Bureau nominated 332 persons for protection; in 2016, under the BJP led NDA government, the number of people identified by Intelligence Bureau and MHA for police protection shot up to 454.   A spokesperson of the MHA dismissed allegations that the list of persons given police protection is prepared arbitrarily.  He said, "The number of protectees keeps changing depending on reports and inputs received from the security agencies. " Home Minister Rajnath Singh's predecessor Sushil Kumar Shinde, had explained that the persons nominated for protection  "Only on the basis of recommendations from the Intelligence Bureau (IB)...We don't do it on our own," The current list includes nine expelled Congress MLAs from Uttarakhand who revolted against Harish Rawat and joined the BJP on 18 May 2016 .  It includes the name of BJP's Kisan Morcha chief Vijay Pal Singh Tomar, Umesh Kumar, a journalist, who carried out a sting on chief minister Rawat.

In 2016 in Delhi categories of security cover was :  42 Z+, 55 Z ; 72 Y (threat); 143 Y (Positional); 67 X category, 19 security under discretion of Commissioner of Police .  Delhi police is responsible for providing security cover to 66.

Crime in Delhi 
'Heinous crime' in Delhi, in 2014, according to government statistics, increased by 157.13 percent from 3268 in 2013, to 8403 in 2014:  Murder is up 7.4 percent from 416 to 447 ; Attempted murder by 36.11 percent from 457 to 622; Rape by 37.64 percent from 1230 to 1693; Burglary by 239.20 percent, from 2352 to 7978; and robbery by 429 percent. Neither the Government or the Police Commissioner gave explanation for the spurt in crime. However, since 2002, Delhi Police can avail the powers of Maharashtra Control of Organised Crime Act, when necessary, in tackling international crime syndicates like the Ndrangheta.

Helplines
Delhi Police has Helpline numbers through which people can seek help without going to the police station in person. The various Helpline numbers of Delhi Police are as follows;
 Police Control Room- 100/112
 Senior Citizens Security Cell- 1291
 Traffic problems- 1095
 Women helpline- 1091
 Anti-Obscene Calls Cell and Anti-stalking Cell – 1091
 Terrorism – 1090
 NORTH-EAST (People from North East India) HELPLINE – 1093
Delhi Police has also launched the facility of registering Online FIR from February 2014.

Controversies
Over the years, Delhi Police has been involved in a series of controversies; ranging from custodial deaths, refusal to write First Information Report, inaction and collusion with arsonists during communal riots. At various times, Delhi Police has been found to be harsher on criminals which has caused it to get warnings from the Supreme Court of India and Central Bureau of Investigation.

Delhi Police has often been reported as one of the most corrupt police forces in the country, with the highest number of complaints in the Indian Police Services being registered against its personnel.

In December 2019, Delhi Police entered the Jamia Millia Islamia campus and fired tear gas cannons in confined spaces including the library and lathi-charged students to disperse the protests against the Citizenship (Amendment) Act.

In January 2020, Jawaharlal Nehru University (JNU) students and teachers accused Delhi Police of complicity in violence committed by a masked mob that attacked students, teachers, and security guards with stones and iron rods while Delhi Police personnel kept watching.

In February 2020, the U.S. Commission on International Religious Freedom (USCIRF) said that Delhi Police failed to stop violent attacks against Muslims during 2020 communal riots. USCIRF urged the Government of India to take immediate action for the safety of its citizens.

In February 2020, United Nations High Commissioner for Human Rights Michelle Bachelet expressed her concern over (Delhi) police inaction during the violence in Delhi.

In September 2020, a member of the CPI(M) politburo Brinda Karat said that Delhi Police has filed a "cheatsheet" instead of a chargesheet in the case of Delhi communal violence that took place in February 2020. Ms Karat added that Delhi Police – which works under the directions of Home Ministry (headed by minister Amit Shah) – is trying to cheat the people of India by falsely implicating the innocent protesters who opposed the government’s discriminatory citizenship laws, including the Citizenship Amendment Act (or CAA).

In August 2021, a court observed that Delhi Police conducted a poor investigation into a large number of 2020 northeast Delhi riots cases and sought the intervention of the Delhi Police Commissioner.

In October 2022, a fact-finding committee - headed by a former Supreme Court judge Madan B. Lokur - on the February 2020 communal riots in north-east Delhi concluded that Delhi Police was “complicit” in the violence against Muslims. The committee also said that Delhi Police showed lack of professionalism and colluded with the ruling BJP against anti-CAA protesters.

Vehicles

Chevrolet Tavera
Toyota Qualis
Royal Enfield Bullet
Bajaj Pulsar
Maruti Gypsy
Maruti Suzuki SX4
Hindustan Ambassador
TVS Apache
SML Isuzu Prison Vans
Tata LATC SWAT carrier
Toyota Innova
Mahindra Scorpio
Maruti Ertiga

SWAT Commandos
Were formed in 2009 in wake of 26/11,they saw action first in 2010 Commonwealth Games,they were tasked with protection duties. They are trained on the lines of National Security Guard. All the commandos are under 28 years of age, thus making them fit and capable of tasks meant for commandos. Their main work is to fight against any terrorist attack that occurs in Delhi NCR. They have been trained exclusively in Krav Maga. Delhi was one of the first cities to get an all-women SWAT team.
SWAT team members will function under the elite Special Cell.

Equipment:
Glock Pistol.
AK-47 Assault rifle.
Trichy assault rifle.
Heckler & Koch MP5 submachine gun.
CornerShot gun.

References

External links
 Official site of Delhi Police
 Delhi Traffic Police

See also
 National Police Memorial India
 Corps of Military Police (India)
 Emergency telephone number

 
1981 establishments in Delhi
Metropolitan law enforcement agencies of India
Government agencies established in 1981
Government agencies established in 1861
1861 establishments in British India